Andrea Gámiz and Georgina García Pérez were the defending champions, but García Pérez chose not to participate. Gámiz partnered Daniela Seguel, but they lost in the semifinals to Montserrat González and Sílvia Soler Espinosa. 

González and Soler Espinosa won the title, defeating Julia Glushko and Priscilla Hon in the final, 6–4, 6–3.

Seeds

Draw

References
Main Draw

Barcelona Women World Winner - Doubles